Nick Stellino (born May 1, 1958) is a Sicilian-American and Italian-American television chef.  One half of his family is from Northern Italy and the other half is Sicilian. He hosts the cooking programs Cucina Amore and Nick Stellino's Family Kitchen on public television station KCTS 9 in Seattle, Washington.

Television shows
Stellino began by hosting three seasons of Cucina Amore. His other main cooking show was Nick Stellino's Family Kitchen; both were presented by KCTS, a PBS-affiliated television station in Seattle. His most recent show, Nick Stellino: Storyteller in the Kitchen, was presented by WCNY, the PBS station in Syracuse, New York. Stellino's current shows are distributed by American Public Television.

Books
Stellino is the author of several cookbooks, which include the following: 
 Cucina Amore
 Nick Stellino's Glorious Italian Cooking
 Nick Stellino's Mediterranean Flavors
 Nick Stellino's Family Kitchen
 Nick Stellino's Passione: Pasta, Pizza, Panini
 Mangiamo! Let's Eat! 
 Dine In
 "Nick Stellino's Cooking with Friends"

Notable achievements and appearances
 Grand Marshal, San Francisco Columbus Day Parade, 1999 (the first chef to be given the honor)
 Annual participant, Aspen Food and Wine Festival
 Presenter, James Beard Foundation Awards, New York City, 2000, 2001
 Chosen chef, Grandma Gala Dinner, James Beard Foundation Awards, New York City
 Celebrity chef, Red Tie Affair, Red Cross of Santa Monica
 Celebrity chef, Seattle Festa Italiana, 2007
 Celebrity chef, Milwaukee Festa Italiana, 2008

References

External links
 Nick Stellino Official Website
 Nick Stellino Bio

1958 births
Living people
American male chefs
American food writers
American television chefs
American people of Italian descent